African daisy is a common name for several plants and may refer to:
These genera in the family Asteraceae
 Arctotis
 Dimorphotheca
 Gazania
 Gerbera
 Lonas
 Osteospermum

See also
 List of African daisy diseases

Asteraceae